George (c. 1250 – 1298/1299) was the king of the Ongud and an official of the Yuan dynasty in the late 13th century.

George's birth date is not recorded, but analysis of his skeleton shows that he died at about forty years of age. Chinese sources trace his lineage back three generations. He was the son of Aybuqa, son of Boyoqa, son of Alagush Tegin Quri. He was married twice. His first wife was Qudadmiš, a granddaughter of the Emperor Khublai Khan. She died young and George married Aiyašri, a daughter of Khublai Khan's grandson Temür Khan. In the summer of 1294, he was granted the title "Prince of Gaotang" (Gaotang wang 高唐) by the Chinese sovereign.

George belonged to the Church of the East. In 1294 or 1295, George met the Franciscan friar John of Montecorvino, who converted him to Catholicism. He gave John permission to construct a Catholic church in the Ongud capital, Olon Süme. He took minor orders so that he could participate in the office of the Mass while wearing his royal robes. John claims that George maintained his Catholic faith, but Li Tang points out that he maintained certain practices (such as prayers in Syriac) that could indicate that he remained attached to the Church of the East.

During the Yuan–Chagatai war, Temür Khan sent George to the western border to attack the Chagatai. In April 1297, he defeated them at the battle of Bayasi. In the winter of 1298, however, his garrison came under attack by the Chagatai leader Duwa; he was captured and executed.

George was first buried at Bole. He was succeeded by his son John, aged only two or three. In 1310, John received permission from the Emperor Wuzong to bring his father's body back for burial in the family cemetery at Yelike'ersi. George's tomb has been found in Guyuan.

Notes

Bibliography

1290s deaths
Yuan dynasty generals
Mongol Empire Christians
Nestorians
Church of the East in China
Chinese Roman Catholics